Susan Georgia Nugent is the president of Illinois Wesleyan University. She was president of Kenyon College in Gambier, Ohio from 2003 to 2013, and interim president of the College of Wooster in Wooster, Ohio for the 2015-16 academic year.  She was succeeded at Kenyon by Sean M. Decatur, former dean of Arts and Sciences at Oberlin College, and at Wooster by Sarah Bolton, former dean of Williams College. In November of 2019, Nugent became the first woman to serve as President of Illinois Wesleyan University.

Early career
Nugent was born in New Orleans, Louisiana, and attended Princeton University, from which she graduated cum laude in 1973. She earned a Ph.D. in classics from Cornell University and taught at Swarthmore College, Princeton, and Brown University.  Her academic speciality, reflected in numerous publications, was epic poetry and Greek tragedy.  She returned to the classics department at Princeton in 1992 and also worked in the university's administration for a decade, including as associate provost and, later, as dean of the McGraw Center.

College President
Nugent became Kenyon College's 18th president and first female president in 2003. As president, she oversaw the construction of the $70 million Kenyon Athletic Center (KAC), and undertook the largest capital campaign in the college's 188-year history. President Nugent was an outspoken supporter of the Amethyst Initiative, which she co-authored with 8 other presidents of American colleges and universities in 2008.

On President's Day, S. Georgia Nugent often switched roles with a Kenyon student who went to faculty and staff meetings while she attended class, visited professors during their office hours and ate meals at the campus dining hall.  President Nugent chose the student through a contest that asked students why they wanted to be President for a day.

After leaving Kenyon, she joined the Council of Independent Colleges (CIC) as a senior fellow to lead their Campaign for the Liberal Arts.

In August 2019, S. Georgia Nugent became Illinois Wesleyan University's Interim President for the 2019-2020 academic year. The university's 19th President Eric Jensen announced in May 2019 that he will be stepping down  after four years with the university. He also announced his subsequent retirement from higher education.

On November 14, 2019, Nugent was selected as the 20th and first female president of Illinois Wesleyan University.

References

Presidents of Kenyon College
Cornell University alumni
Princeton University alumni
Swarthmore College faculty
Brown University faculty
Princeton University faculty
Living people
Year of birth missing (living people)